Geoffrey Andrew Huegill (born 4 March 1979) is an Australian swimmer and dual Olympian who won seventy-two international medals, including two medals in Olympics and six world champion titles, throughout his career. He held eight world records, including 50 metres butterfly.

Huegill has been recognised as technically the best butterflier and was the dominant butterfly champion during the early 2000s.

Affectionately known as 'Skippy', he is the nation's favourite comeback kid. Huegill came out of retirement in 2008 and shed 45 kilograms of weight to fight his way back to competition and was declared a national hero when he won gold at the 2010 Delhi Commonwealth Games in the 100 metre butterfly. He won the race in 51.69 seconds and broke the Commonwealth games record and his own ten-year-old personal best time.

In 2010, he was voted Australian Sport Performer of the Year.

Early life 
Huegill was born on 4 March 1979 in Nhulunbuy on the Gove Peninsula in the Northern Territory. His mother, Kanthong Jum Summart, is from Chaiyaphum, Thailand while his father, Ronald Huegill, was a miner. Huegill grew up in Mackay and has an older brother, Graeme.

Huegill attended Southern Cross Catholic College in Scarborough, Queensland. In July 2013, he was awarded an honorary masters degree in sports science with high class honors from Central Queensland University.

Huegill started swimming in Mackay and showed talent from an early age. He joined coach Ken Wood’s squad on invitation, at the age of 11. After the death of his father due to a heart attack, Geoff started to live with his coach permanently.

Career

1996–2005 
In 1996, Huegill burst onto the international stage at the Mare Nostrum tour. The same year, at the age of 17, he broke the first of his many world records as part of a FINA sanctioned medley relay time trial in Melbourne, Australia.

The following year he secured his spot on the Australian team to compete at the 1997 FINA World Short Course Championships in Gothenburg, Sweden and came home with a gold and silver medal.

In 1998, Huegill competed at his first commonwealth games in Kuala Lumpur, Malaysia. He won two gold medals in the 100 meters butterfly and 4x100 meters Medley relay.

In 1999, Huegill won a silver medal in the 100 meters butterfly at the Pan Pacific Swimming Championships long course event in Sydney, Australia.

At the 2000 Australian Championships in Sydney which doubled as the Olympic qualifying trials, Huegill broke the 50 meters butterfly world record swimming a time of 23.60 seconds.

At the Sydney Olympics in 2000 Huegill broke the olympic record in the 100 meters butterfly semi-final with a time of 51.96 seconds and was the fastest qualifier leading into the finals. He placed third in the final scoring bronze with a time of 52.22 seconds. Huegill also won a silver medal in the 4x100 meters medley relay.

In 2001, at the FINA World Championships in Fukuoka, Japan the 50 meters butterfly was introduced as an inaugural event and Huegill beat his previous world record time and won gold in a time of 23.44 seconds. He also won a gold medal in the 4x100 meters medley relay and a bronze medal in the 100 meters butterfly.

At the 2002 Commonwealth Games in Manchester, United Kingdom, Huegill won gold in all three of his events, the 50 meters butterfly, the 100 meters butterfly and the 4x100 meters medley relay.

In 2002, Huegill went on to win another two gold medals in the 50 meters butterfly and 100 meters butterfly and a silver medal in the 4x100 meters medley relay at the FINA World Championships short course event in Moscow, Russia.

At the 2003 FINA World Championships long course event in Barcelona, Spain Huegill finished fourth in the 50 meters butterfly and failed to make the final of the 100 meters butterfly.

Huegill has since reflected that by 2004 he was struggling with motivation for swimming and depression. He still went on to secure his place on the Australian team for the Athens Olympic Games and raced in the 100 meters butterfly. He qualified for the final but finished in 8th place overall.

First retirement 
In 2004, after the Athens Olympics, Huegill took a four months break to refocus his priorities.

Meanwhile, he started to develop interest in things outside of swimming. At the age of 25, he amicably parted with longtime coach Ken Wood and moved to Sydney to live with his model girlfriend, Nikki Giteau. While based in Sydney, Huegill became a regular part of the social scene and was often seen present at Sydney night spots.

Later, he tried to make a comeback under a new coach, Steve Alderman, at University of Sydney. At the trials for the 2006 Commonwealth Games, Huegill performed poorly, failed to make the team and announced his retirement from the sport.

Comeback after first retirement (2008–2012) 
In November 2008, weighing in at 138 kilograms, Huegill decided to come back and compete in international swimming competitions. He joined the New South Wales Institute of Sport and trained in Sydney under new coach Grant Stoelwinder.

The focus of Huegill’s comeback was the 2010 Delhi Commonwealth Games. Huegill was triumphant in fighting his way back to the podium. He shed a total of 45 kilograms and won gold at the 2010 Delhi Commonwealth Games in the 100 meters butterfly. He won the race in 51.69 seconds and broke the Commonwealth games record and his own ten-year-old record personal best time. Huegill also came away with a silver medal in the 50 meters butterfly.

In 2010, he was voted Australian Sport Performer of the Year.
 
In 2011, at the FINA World Long Course Championships in Shanghai, China, Huegill won a silver medal in the 4x100m Medley Relay and a bronze medal in the 50m butterfly.

Retirement 
In 2012, following recurring illnesses, Huegill failed to appear in the London Olympics. At the qualifying trials, in March 2012, he finished fifth in the 100m butterfly final.

Huegill announced his second retirement from swimming.

Outside of swimming 
Huegill made a guest appearance in season one of Australia's Next Top Model.

In 2003, Huegill was crowned as Cleo'''s Bachelor of the Year after receiving the most votes from readers. Cleo editor, Paula Joye, described Huegill as "the nicest guy, totally humble about his abilities, funny and charming to be around, he's the total package." In the same year, Huegill travelled to Vietnam to record a television documentary for AusAID, the arm of the Australian government that invests in projects and provides investment assistance to developing countries.

In 2010, Huegill was a special guest presenter at the Australian Recording Industry Association 2010 ARIA Awards. Huegill was a regular guest presenter on ABC Radio's Grandstand Active Show covering sporting issues of the day, overnight scores and live crosses to sport.

A keen sailor, Huegill has placed twice in the Sydney to Hobart Yacht Race which is widely considered to be one of the most difficult yacht races in the world. In 2010, Huegill joined the celebrity crew on board Anthony Bell's 30 metre maxi yacht, Investec Loyal. The crew included seven-time world surfing champion Layne Beachley, Wallabies Phil Kearns and Phil Waugh and cricketer Mathew Hayden. They came together to raise money for the Humpty Dumpty Foundation to buy medical equipment for children's hospitals. Ivestec Loyal came in second across the line to Wild Oats.

In 2012, Huegill raced as crew aboard the 100-foot supermaxi Ragamuffin Loyal who took second place. At Constitution Dock skipper, Syd Fischer, said of Huegill, "He's bloody good. He worked hard. He didn't let up."

In October 2021, Geoff was announced as a part of the celebrity cast for 2022 SAS Australia, Season 3.

 Businesses 
Huegill released a capsule collection of scientifically engineered compression and performance garments. The collection was sold through luxury apparel retailers such as Stylerunner and Mode Sportif.

Huegill set up O Performance, a performance coaching and consulting business focused on delivering coaching, development programs and events in Asia. It covers all levels including; water safety, learn to swim, junior development, adult programs, squads as well as competition preparation and executive performance coaching.

 Legal issues 
On 26 April 2014, Huegill and his wife Sara Hills were guests at The Australian Turf Club’s Autumn Racing Carnival. They attended an event hosted by Moët & Chandon in The Stables, an exclusive lounge in the member's area of Randwick Racecourse. Police patrolling the area were directed to a suite in the grandstand by security personnel after CCTV footage showed the couple venturing into a disabled toilet. They were found to be in possession of a small quantity of cocaine and were each charged with possession of a prohibited drug.

Huegill has since explained they did not plan to do cocaine, or bring it into the grounds of the racecourse commenting, "It was just something that was there on the day. We got caught up in a moment…just a bad choice in that moment – nothing more, nothing less."

On 14 May 2014, Huegill and Hills attended Waverley Court and pleaded guilty to cocaine possession. The magistrate put the pair on a six-month good behaviour bond and recorded no criminal conviction.

 Sponsorships, ambassadorships, and charity work 
Huegill had a long standing association with his major sponsor, Commonwealth Bank. During his swimming career, he became a Commonwealth Bank ambassador. In 2012, after his second retirement from swimming, Huegill transitioned into an internal role at Commonwealth Bank in the corporate financial services team. He later took on a new role at the bank in corporate performance and wellbeing, rolling out programs for the bank's staff nationally.

In 2011, Huegill was named the Australian face of men’s skincare range Biotherm Homme for the French brand’s Aquapower skincare line.

Throughout his career Huegill has worked with a variety of brands through sponsorship and ambassador partnerships including; Swisse, Red Bull, Commonwealth Bank, Speedo, Foxtel, Subaru, Gatorade, Audi, Biotherm, Telstra, Thai Airways, SleepMaker, Australian Grapes, Fitness First, Bartercard.

Huegill has been the face of campaigns for DrinkWise, Black Dog Institute, and R U OK?. He has held ambassador positions with Swimming Australia, AusAID, Sydney Children’s Hospital, and the Loyal Foundation.

Huegill also chaired the NSW Premier's Council for Active Living (PCAL), an initiative that aimed to strengthen physical and social environments to enable active living.

 World records 

 Short course (25 m)

 Long course (50 m)

 Medals 
 Gold medals 

 Short course (25 m)

 Long course (50 m)

 Silver medals 

 Short course (25 m)

 Long course (50 m)

 Bronze medals 

 Short course (25 m)

 Long course (50 m)

 Personal life 
Huegill married Sara Hills in 2011. They have two daughters, born in 2012 and 2014. After separating earlier in 2018, Huegill made a public announcement in December the same year and the couple divorced.

Since 2019 Huegill has been in a relationship with Australian lawyer, technology executive and investor Roxan Toll whose family founded the eponymous Toll Group, one of Australia’s oldest companies and Asia-Pacific’s largest transport and logistics provider. The couple have a son born in 2021.

Publications
 Be Your Best: Hunt For Gold'', TV documentary for FOXTEL, aired in February 2012.

See also
 List of Commonwealth Games medallists in swimming (men)
 List of Olympic medalists in swimming (men)
 World record progression 50 metres butterfly

References

External links
 
 

1979 births
Living people
Sportspeople from Mackay, Queensland
Australian male butterfly swimmers
Sportsmen from the Northern Territory
Olympic swimmers of Australia
Swimmers at the 1998 Commonwealth Games
Swimmers at the 2000 Summer Olympics
Swimmers at the 2002 Commonwealth Games
Swimmers at the 2004 Summer Olympics
Swimmers at the 2010 Commonwealth Games
Commonwealth Games gold medallists for Australia
Olympic silver medalists for Australia
Olympic bronze medalists for Australia
Australian people of German descent
Australian people of Thai descent
World record setters in swimming
Olympic bronze medalists in swimming
World Aquatics Championships medalists in swimming
Medalists at the FINA World Swimming Championships (25 m)
Medalists at the 2000 Summer Olympics
Olympic silver medalists in swimming
Commonwealth Games medallists in swimming
Goodwill Games medalists in swimming
Competitors at the 2001 Goodwill Games
Medallists at the 1998 Commonwealth Games
Medallists at the 2002 Commonwealth Games
Medallists at the 2010 Commonwealth Games